The 2018 New Mexico gubernatorial election took place on November 6, 2018, to elect the next governor of New Mexico, concurrently with the election of New Mexico's Class I U.S. Senate seat, as well as other elections to the United States Senate in other states, elections to the United States House of Representatives and various local elections.

Incumbent Republican Governor Susana Martinez was term-limited and could not seek reelection to a third consecutive term. Following party primaries on June 5, 2018, U.S. Representative Steve Pearce was the Republican nominee and U.S. Representative Michelle Lujan Grisham was the Democratic nominee. Lujan Grisham won the election by a substantial margin, which in fact was a complete and exact reversal of the 2014 gubernatorial results. Her win also signaled a continuation of the pattern of the partisanship of the office changing every two terms, beginning with Gary Johnson's first election in 1994. Furthermore, the pattern of the partisanship changing with each officeholder was continued, a pattern first started after Toney Anaya left office in 1987. Furthermore, the margin between the candidates (57.2% to 42.8%) was the same as the previous election, albeit with the parties switched.

Background
At the presidential level, New Mexico has begun to trend into a Democratic-leaning swing state. It has gone Democratic in all but one presidential election since 1992. The only break in this trend came in 2004, when George W. Bush won it by less than a point. However, in 2008, Barack Obama won the state over John McCain by 15 points and in 2012 by 10 points over Mitt Romney. In 2016, Democrat Hillary Clinton defeated Republican Donald Trump by eight points.

However, in 2010, then-District Attorney of New Mexico's Third Judicial District Susana Martinez won the election, becoming the first US Latina Governor, over Lieutenant Governor Diane Denish, former running mate of two-term Democrat Bill Richardson, by approximately seven points. In 2014, Martinez was re-elected over state Attorney General Gary King by nearly 15 points. It has been described as one of the Democrats' best chances at a pickup, due to Gov. Martinez's unpopularity and because "she's leaving behind a high unemployment rate and struggling education system."

The 2018 primary election results show 116,311 votes for Democratic candidate Michelle Lujan Grisham and a total of 175,182 for all three Democratic candidates while Republican candidate/nominee Steve Pearce received 74,705; note that 23% of New Mexico's registered voters are third party or independents (280,000), who do not vote in the primary election.

Republican primary

Governor

Candidates

Nominated
 Steve Pearce, U.S. Representative, candidate for the U.S. Senate in 2000 and nominee for the U.S. Senate in 2008

Declined
 Aubrey Dunn Jr., New Mexico Commissioner of Public Lands and candidate for NM-02 in 2008
 John Sanchez, Lieutenant Governor and nominee for Governor of New Mexico in 2002

Results

Lieutenant Governor

Candidates

Declared
 Michelle Garcia Holmes, former chief of staff to Attorney General Gary King, former police detective and candidate for Mayor of Albuquerque in 2017

Withdrew
 Kelly Zunie, former secretary of the New Mexico Indian Affairs Department

Declined
 Ted Barela, former state senator
 Mark Moores, state senator
 Cliff Pirtle, state senator

Results

Democratic primary

Governor

Candidates

Nominated
 Michelle Lujan Grisham, U.S. Representative

Eliminated in primary
 Jeff Apodaca, businessman and son of former governor Jerry Apodaca
 Joe Cervantes, state senator

Declined
 Hector Balderas, Attorney General (running for re-election)
 Javier Gonzales, former Mayor of Santa Fe (running for lieutenant governor)
 Martin Heinrich, U.S. Senator (running for reelection)
 Tim Keller, Mayor of Albuquerque and former State Auditor
 Ben Ray Luján, U.S. Representative
 Tom Udall, U.S. Senator
 Alan Webber, Mayor of Santa Fe and candidate for Governor in 2014

Endorsements

Polling

Results

Lieutenant Governor

Candidates

Declared
 Billy Garrett, Doña Ana County Commissioner
Rick Miera, former Majority Leader of the New Mexico House of Representatives
 Howie Morales, state senator and candidate for governor in 2014

Withdrew
 David McTeigue, juvenile probation officer
Jeff Carr, retired teacher and former New Mexico Public Education Commissioner
Michael Padilla, state senator
 Javier Gonzales, former Mayor of Santa Fe

Declined
 Brian Colón, former chairman of the Democratic Party of New Mexico, nominee for lieutenant governor in 2010 and candidate for Mayor of Albuquerque in 2017 (Running for State Auditor)
 Bill O'Neill, state senator

Results

Libertarian primary
Based on the party's voter registration numbers and presidential nominee Gary Johnson's result in 2016, the Libertarian Party holds major-party status in New Mexico. Under New Mexico law, both gubernatorial and lieutenant governor candidates must receive each at least 230 signatures from registered Libertarian voters to formally receive the nomination and be placed on the ballot as the Libertarian nominees. Both Walsh and Dunn failed to meet that requirement and were not on the ballot.

Governor

Candidates

Declared
 Bob Walsh, retired mathematician

Declined
 Aubrey Dunn, Jr., Commissioner of Public Lands(ran for the U.S. Senate, but dropped out)
 Gary Johnson, former Republican governor and nominee for president in 2012 and 2016(running for the U.S. Senate)

Results

Lieutenant Governor

Candidates

Declared
 Robin Dunn, wife of Aubrey Dunn, Jr.

Results

General election

Endorsements

Debates
Complete video of debate, September 19, 2018

Predictions

Polling

Results

By county

By congressional district

See also
New Mexico elections, 2018

Notes 

Partisan clients

References

External links
Candidates at Vote Smart
Candidates at Ballotpedia

Official Governor campaign websites
Michelle Lujan Grisham (D) for Governor
Steve Pearce (R) for Governor
Bob Walsh (L) for Governor

Official Lt. Governor campaign websites
Michelle Garcia Holmes (R) for Lieutenant Governor
Howie Morales (D) for Lieutenant Governor

2018 New Mexico elections
2018
2018 United States gubernatorial elections